The School of International Service (SIS) is American University's school of advanced international study, covering areas such as international politics, international communication, international development, international economics, peace and conflict resolution, international law and human rights, global environmental politics, and U.S. foreign policy.

The School of International Service was established in 1957 and has an alumni network of over 20,000. SIS enrolls more than 3,000 students from over 150 countries. The school makes extensive use of the academic and governmental resources offered by its location in Washington, D.C. The School of International Service consistently ranks highly among international relations programs. SIS is a member of the Association of Professional Schools of International Affairs. SIS also has partnerships with schools such as the Balsillie School of International Affairs.

History

The founding of schools of international affairs was urged by President Dwight D. Eisenhower during the height of the Cold War. His initiative called together thirteen University presidents, including AU's Hurst Robins Anderson, encouraging them to create human-focused international affairs programs dedicated to preparing practitioners for foreign policy beyond the U.S.–Soviet rivalry. In response, SIS was founded with the mission to establish a school based on service to the global community. In 1958, the school admitted its first full-time class, replacing AU's Department of International Relations. The class consisted of 85 students representing 36 countries.

In 1967, SIS added its International Communications program, the first such program offered by an American university. In 1981 SIS inaugurated the Ibn Khaldun Chair of Islamic Studies to address concerns that American universities lacked an appropriate venue for exploring the greater Muslim-Western understanding. In the 1990s, SIS established dual degree programs with Ritsumeikan University in Kyoto, Japan and Korea University in Seoul, Korea. In 1991, SIS added the Center for the Global South, followed in 1995 by the addition of the Mohammed Said Farsi Chair in Islamic Peace, and in 2000 with a joint program on National Resources and Sustainable Development with the United Nations University for Peace. New degree options implemented in 2010 include the Global Scholars Program, a concentrated three-year B.A. program, an M.A. program in Social Enterprise, and, in partnership with the U.S. Peace Corps, a Master's International degree combining a Peace Corps assignment with SIS academic work.

New building
In 2004, plans were initiated for a new, academic building designed by architect William McDonough, which was completed in spring 2010. It is a LEED Gold-certified building, featuring  of photovoltaic solar panels, low-flow faucets to reduce water consumption, and three solar water heating systems.

SIS publications
Clocks and Clouds is American University's undergraduate journal of international affairs.

The Journal of International Service is American University's graduate journal of international affairs.

Intercultural Management Quarterly is published by the Intercultural Management Institute, which provides customized training for effective communication, negotiation, and leadership across cultures.

Academics

Bachelor's degrees
The School of International Service offers a Bachelor of Arts in International Studies. The School also allows undergraduate students to earn a minor in International Studies as well as undergraduate certificates in either European Studies and International Studies.

Master's degrees
The School of International Service offers the following master's degrees:
 Master of Science in Development Management
 Master of Arts in Ethics, Peace, and Human Rights
 Master of Arts in Global Environmental Policy
 Master of Arts in International Affairs (with a concentration in Comparative and Regional Studies; Global Governance, Politics, and Security; International Economic Relations; Natural Resources and Sustainable Development; or United States Foreign Policy and National Security)
Master of Arts in International Affairs Policy and Analysis
 Master of Arts in Intercultural and International Communication
 Master of Arts in International Development
 Master of Arts in International Economics Relations
 Master of Arts in International Economics Relations: Quantitative Methods
 Master of Arts in International Peace and Conflict Resolution
 Master of Arts in International Relations (only available online)
 Master of Arts in Social Enterprise

SIS also offers several combined degrees:
 Combined Bachelor of Arts/Master of Arts (BA/MA) (for current American University undergraduate students only)
 Juris Doctor/Master of Arts in International Affairs (with a concentration in International Affairs) (with American's Washington College of Law)
 Master of Arts in International Affairs/Master of Business Administration 
 Master of Arts in International Peace and Conflict Resolution/Master of Arts in Teaching
 Master of Arts International Peace and Conflict Resolution/Master of Theological Studies
 Dual Master of Arts in Natural Resources and Sustainable Development (with the University for Peace)

The School also has programs with Ritsumeikan University, Korea University, and Sookmyung University. Information on dual-degree, semester, or summer/intersession study abroad programs are available on the Office of International Programs website.

Ph.D. program
The Ph.D. program in International Relations at SIS prepares students for careers as teachers and scholars at universities and research institutes in the private and public sectors. Ph.D. field concentrations include Development Studies; Global Environment; Global Governance & International Organizations; Peace & Conflict Resolution; Political Violence; Security; Technology, Culture & Social Change; and United States Foreign Policy and National Security.

Executive master's degree
In this program, experienced international affairs professionals are able to broaden their knowledge, enhance their intellectual development, expand their professional effectiveness, and strengthen their international leadership skills and knowledge.
One can construct an individually tailored program of study from among the school's eight disciplines:
 Comparative and Regional Studies
 Global Environmental Politics
 International Communication
 International Development
 International Economic Relations
 International Politics and Foreign Policy
 International Peace and Conflict Resolution
 U.S. Foreign Policy

Graduate certificates
SIS Graduate Certificate Programs:
 Comparative and Regional Studies
 Cross-Cultural Communication
 European Studies
 Global Environmental Policy
 Global Information Technology
 International Arts Management
 International Communication
 International Economic Policy
 International Economic Relations
 International Peace and Conflict Resolution
 International Politics
 Peacebuilding
 The Americas
 United States Foreign Policy

Online Programs 
American University's School of International Service offers two online international relations degrees: a Master of Arts in International Relations (MAIR) and an Executive Master of International Service (MIS). The MAIR program features live online classes and five concentrations, including Global Security, International Development, and International Negotiation and Conflict Resolution. The Executive MIS degree is designed for professionals with seven or more years of experience in the fields of international affairs or international service.

Research and learning centers
 ASEAN Studies Center
 Bridging the Gap
 Center for Latin American and Latino Studies
 Center for Global Peace
 Center for Research on Collaboratories and Technology Enhanced Learning Communities (COTELCO)
 Forum for Climate Engineering Assessment
 Institute on Disability and Public Policy
 Intercultural Management Institute
 International Affairs Research Institute
 Public International Law and Policy Program
 Transnational Challenges and Emerging Nations Dialogue
 US-Pakistan Women's Council

Notable faculty
Notable current and former SIS faculty include:
 Mohammed Abu-Nimer – expert on conflict-resolution and the politics of the Middle East
 Amitav Acharya– UNESCO Chair in Transnational Challenges and Governance
 Akbar S. Ahmed – former Ambassador of Pakistan to the United Kingdom
 George Ayittey – President of the Free Africa Foundation; political economics professor
 Robert A. Blecker – economist specializing in macroeconomics and international trade theory
 Edmund Ghareeb – Lebanese-American scholar specializing in Middle East politics
 James Goldgeier – foreign policy scholar specializing in American foreign policy, including US-Russia relations
 Louis W. Goodman - international relations scholar, specializing in Latin America
 Frank William La Rue – UN Special Rapporteur and human rights scholar-activist
 Charles Malik – former president of the United Nations Economic and Social Council
 Renee Marlin-Bennett – expert on global political economy
 Hamid Mowlana – Iranian-American advisor and academic
 Orlando Letelier – Chilean economist and diplomat
 James H. Mittelman – expert on globalization and development
Anthony C. E. Quainton – United States Ambassador to the Central African Empire, Kuwait, Nicaragua, and Peru; United States Coordinator for Counterterrorism
 Arturo C. Porzecanski – Distinguished Economist-in-Residence; Professor and Program Director of the MA in International Economic Relations; investor
 Andrew E. Rice – founder of the Society for International Development
 Susan Rice – the 24th United States National Security Advisor from 2013 to 2017 during the Barack Obama Administration. She was formerly a U.S. diplomat, Brookings Institution fellow, and U.S. Ambassador to the United Nations. She served on the staff of the National Security Council and as Assistant Secretary of State for African Affairs during President Bill Clinton's second term.
 Abdul Aziz Said – foreign affairs scholar specializing in diplomacy Islamic world
 David J. Saposs – economist and historian; former chief economist of the National Labor Relations Board
 Cathy Schneider – author and professor of urban politics, comparative social movements, and criminal justice
 Stephen Silvia – scholar of international economics, international trade relations, and comparative politics (with emphasis on Germany and United States)
 Roger Tangri – British-American scholar of African politics
 Irene Tinker – expert on comparative global development; founding Board president of the International Center for Research on Women
 Celeste A. Wallander – professor; specialist on military and energy in Russia/Eurasia region; member of the Council on Foreign Relations;
 Paul R. Williams – human rights lawyer and President of the Public International Law & Policy Group
 Ibram X. Kendi - scholar of race and discriminatory policy in America
 Earl Anthony Wayne - Formerly Assistant Secretary of State for Economic and Business Affairs and Ambassador to Argentina and Mexico

Notes

External links
 School of International Service

American University
Schools of international relations in the United States
Public policy schools
Educational institutions established in 1957
1957 establishments in Washington, D.C.